Jianchang Avenue Subdistrict is a subdistrict situated at the northern portion of Hebei District, Tianjin, China. It borders Yixingbu Town and Jinzhong Subdistrict to its north, Jiangdu Road and Yueyahe Subdistricts to its southeast, as well as Ningyuan and Tiedong Road Subdistricts to its west. It had 90,362 people residing under its administration as of 2010.

The subdistrict was created in 1981. It was named after Jianchang Avenue that passes through it.

Geography 
Jianchang Avenue subdistrict is on the southern bank of Xinkai River, and is bypassed by the Beitang Paishui River.

Administrative divisions 
At the end of 2021, a total of 17 residential communities constituted Jianchang Avenue Subdistrict. They are organized into the following list:

References 

Township-level divisions of Tianjin
Hebei District, Tianjin